Towards Evening is a 1990 Italian drama film directed by Francesca Archibugi. It was entered into the 17th Moscow International Film Festival. For her performance Zoe Incrocci was awarded with a David di Donatello for Best Supporting Actress and a Silver Ribbon in the same category. The film also won the David di Donatello for Best Film and the Nastro d'Argento for Best Actor (to Marcello Mastroianni).

Cast
 Marcello Mastroianni as Prof. Bruschi
 Sandrine Bonnaire as Stella
 Zoe Incrocci as Elvira
 Giorgio Tirabassi as Oliviero
 Victor Cavallo as Pippo
 Veronica Lazar as Margherita
 Lara Pranzoni as Papere
 Paolo Panelli as Galliano, the hairdresser
 Giovanna Ralli as Pina
 Gisella Burinato as Stella's mother
 Pupo De Luca as Judge
 Dante Biagioni as Architect

References

External links

1990 films
1990 drama films
Italian drama films
1990s Italian-language films
Films directed by Francesca Archibugi
Films set in Rome
Films set in 1977
1990s Italian films